Dear Nicole may refer to:

 "Dear Nicole", a short story by Jessica Treadway
 "Dear Nicole", a song by Frankmusik